James Douglas McLachlan  (1869–1937) was the first British wartime Military attaché to Washington, D.C.

Military career
James Douglas McLachlan was born in Semarang, Java, 14 February 1869 and commissioned into the Queen's Own Cameron Highlanders  in 1891.  He participated in the Nile Expedition in 1898 and, subsequently, at the famous Battle of Khartoum. He married Gwendolen Mab White, of Havilah, New South Wales in 1903 at St Margaret Church in London.

As lieutenant colonel, McLachlan commanded the 1st Battalion of the Cameron Highlanders in March 1913 and led it to France in the early stages of the World War I until September 1914, when he was wounded. He then commanded 8th Infantry Brigade from October 1915 to March 1916. He was awarded the Distinguished Service Order (June 1916) and mentioned in dispatches twice (January 1916 and June 1916). He served on the staff as a Brigadier General before being appointed as the first wartime military attaché to the United States;  he arrived in the United States with his wife and two school girl daughters on 11 September 1917.

In-post, he was promoted to Major General. He was raised to a Companion of the Order of the Bath in 3 June 1918 and a Companion of the Order of St Michael and St George in June 1919. Upon relinquishing his post as military attaché, he reverted to his substantive rank of Colonel. He was awarded the United States Distinguished Service Medal in July 1919. He died on 7 November 1937.

References

British military attachés
Companions of the Distinguished Service Order
Companions of the Order of the Bath
Companions of the Order of St Michael and St George
1869 births
1937 deaths
Queen's Own Cameron Highlanders officers
British Army personnel of the Mahdist War
British Army generals of World War I
Military personnel of British India
Foreign recipients of the Distinguished Service Medal (United States)